Sphaerichthys acrostoma, sometimes known as the giant chocolate gourami, is a species of gourami. It is native to Asia, where it is known only from the Kalimantan region of Borneo in Indonesia. The species reaches 4.6 cm (1.8 inches) in standard length, although some sources report a maximum standard length of 7 cm (2.8 inches). It is known to be a facultative air-breather, and females of the species exhibit mouthbrooding.

References 

Luciocephalinae
Fish described in 1979

Osphronemidae